Poet Midang Memorial Hall (a.k.a. Midang Literary House) is a memorial hall built in Seonun-ri, Buan-myeon, Gochang-gun, Jeollabuk-do. It was opened in the fall of 2001 with the backing of the Gochang county governor. It was newly remodeled from a closed elementary school (Seonun Branch School of Bongam Elementary School). Seo Jeong-ju's birthplace and tomb complex are nearby.

See also
Midang Literary Award

References

External links
  

Literary museums in South Korea
Gochang County